Anđelko Rističević (born 23 December 1985) is a Serbian long distance runner who specialises in the marathon. He competed in the men's marathon event at the 2016 Summer Olympics.

References

External links
 
 
 
 
  (archive)

1985 births
Living people
Serbian male long-distance runners
Serbian male marathon runners
Place of birth missing (living people)
Athletes (track and field) at the 2016 Summer Olympics
Olympic athletes of Serbia
21st-century Serbian people